Camp Confidential is a US book series for preteens written by Melissa J. Morgan. It focuses around a group of girls at Camp Lakeview (Later Camp Walla Walla). There are 25 books in this series so far. The series is also sold in the UK under the name Summer Camp Secrets published by Usborne Publishing. Some important female characters in the book series are called: Natalie, Jenna, Grace, Alex, Sarah, Chelsea, Gaby, Brynn, Priya, Alyssa, Avery, Karen, Candace, Abby, Valerie, Tori, Sloan, Tricia, Lainie, Joanna and Anika. Some important male characters in the book series are called: Adam, Simon, Devon, Trevor, Blake, David, Jordan, Spence, Logan, Donovan, Reed, Miles, Connor, and Peter.

Books
Natalie's Secret
Jenna's Dilemma
Grace's Twist
Alex's Challenge
TTYL
RSVP
Second Time's the Charm
Wish You Weren't Here
Best (Boy) Friend Forever
Over and Out
Falling In Like
Winter Games
A Fair To Remember
Hide and Shriek (Scary Super Special)
Reality Bites
Golden Girls
Freaky Tuesday
And the Winner Is...
Charmed Forces (Super Special)
Suddenly Last Summer
Reunion (Super Special)
Extra Credit
Politically Incorrect
Topsy-Turvy
In It To Win It

References

Novel series